Michael A. O'Pake (February 2, 1940 – December 27, 2010) was an American politician who served as a Democratic member of the Pennsylvania State Senate for the 11th District from 1973 to 2010. He served as the Democratic Whip in Pennsylvania from 2000 to 2010.

Early life and education
O'Pake was born on February 2, 1940, in Reading, Pennsylvania to Michael E. and Anna M. O'Pake. He graduated from Reading Central Catholic High School in 1957. He received an A.B. from St. Joseph's University in 1961 and a J.D. from the University of Pennsylvania Law School in 1964. O'Pake was described as a devout Catholic.

Career 
O'Pake was elected to the General Assembly of the Pennsylvania House of Representatives in 1968.

In 1972, O'Pake was elected to represent the 11th district in the Pennsylvania State Senate. In November 2000, he was chosen as the Democratic Whip for the Pennsylvania State Senate. He was reelected to the Whip position for the 2011-2012 legislative term. He served as the first chairman of the Senate Aging and Youth Committee and wrote the Child Protective Services law to help victims of child abuse.

Death
O'Pake died on December 27, 2010, at age 70, following complications suffered during heart bypass surgery. In 2011, Saint Joseph's University named their sports complex the O'Pake Recreational Center in O'Pake's honor.

References

External links
Follow the Money - Mike O'Pake
2006 2004 2002 2000 campaign contributions

1940 births
2010 deaths
19th-century American politicians
20th-century American politicians
Democratic Party members of the Pennsylvania House of Representatives
Pennsylvania lawyers
Democratic Party Pennsylvania state senators
Politicians from Reading, Pennsylvania
Saint Joseph's University alumni
University of Pennsylvania alumni
University of Pennsylvania Law School alumni
20th-century American lawyers